Finschia is a genus of three recognised species of large trees, constituting part of the plant family Proteaceae. They grow naturally in New Guinea and its surrounding region, in habitats from luxuriant lowland rainforests to steep highland forests.

Across various parts of New Guinea and the surrounding region's islands, collectively the three species have known distributions in Papua New Guinea and West Papua, the Bismarck Archipelago, the Solomon Islands, the Aru Islands, Palau and Vanuatu.

Considering the various sources of evidence of their growing in districts from rainforested city surrounds through to villages and to places far from cities' basic facilities or herbaria for botanical science, it is not surprising that official national herbaria hold numerous specimens of un-described, potentially new species, for example in Papua New Guinea's national herbarium in Lae.

Botanists from European backgrounds have scientifically described the current three species as they obtained good enough herbarium dried specimen collections. In their written descriptions of the three species, they briefly comment about potential new species or segregate species, that they have seen on expeditions or refer to in other botanist's collections and descriptions.

People from the region of New Guinea, working professionally, such as in government or science, have published written reports of some of the knowledge and uses of these species of trees. Also, the European botanists' writings allude briefly to the same facts, that societies living naturally in forest locations in this region know very well their own well established uses of these trees—regardless of unknown European scientific names; uses such as planted, long-term food tree–crops around villages. The cooking and eating of the seeds of some varieties of these trees, after their planting and establishment as valued food tree–crops, has been described in published written form in reports, articles and books. 

Published scientific morphology and anatomy observations place them within the subtribe Hakeinae (tribe Embothrieae) and correlate them most closely with some species of Grevillea, then after that with Hakea. Dutch botanist H. O. Sleumer included them within the genus Grevillea in 1939 and in his 1958 Flora Malesiana (Proteaceae) description as again Finschia. In 2009 the first step was reported in the still early studies of their genetics.

Known species
Finschia chloroxantha  – native to New Guinea, Bismarck Archipelago, Solomon Islands, Aru Islands, Palau and Vanuatu
Finschia ferruginiflora  – native to the highlands of Papua New Guinea
Finschia rufa  – native to Papua New Guinea. Synonyms: Finschia carrii , Grevillea carrii

References

External links
 Finschia rufa illustration in Flora Malesiana.

Proteaceae
Proteaceae genera
Flora of Papuasia